USS Becuna (SS/AGSS-319), a  in commission from 1944 to 1969, was ship of the United States Navy named for the becuna, a pike-like fish of Europe. During World War II, she cinducted five war patrols between August 23, 1944 and July 27, 1945, operating in the Philippine Islands, South China Sea, and Java Sea. She is credited with sinking two Japanese tankers totaling 3,888 gross register tons.

After World War II, Becuna operated as part of the United States Pacific Fleet from 1945 to 1949. She served in the United States Atlantic Fleet from 1949 to 1969, primarily as a training ship, although she also made two deployments with the United States Sixth Fleet in the Mediterranean Sea.

After her decommissioning, Becuna was designated a National Historic Landmark for her service in World War II. She became a museum ship at the Independence Seaport Museum in Philadelphia, Pennsylvania.

Construction and commissioning
Becuna was laid down on April 29, 1943 by the Electric Boat Company at Groton, Connecticut. She was launched on January 30, 1944, sponsored by Mrs. George C. Crawford, and commissioned on May 27, 1944 with Lieutenant Commander Henry D. Sturr in command.

Service history

World War II

May–August 1944
After shakedown training from Naval Submarine Base New London, Becuna departed Groton on July 1, 1944 and arrived at Pearl Harbor, Hawaii, on July 29. 1944. She then conducted additional training in the Hawaiian Islands.

First war patrol
Becuna departed Pearl Harbor on August 23, 1944 for her first war patrol. After patrolling for a month without spotting anything but aircraft, she surfaced on the afternoon of September 25, 1944 and her lookouts spied a convoy of three Japanese merchant ships escorted by a destroyer. Becuna submerged and fired a spread of six torpedoes. While she evaded a retaliatory depth-charge attack, her crew heard an explosion but could not verify any sinkings; although she claimed to have destroyed two tankers in the convoy, postwar examination of Japanese records failed to verify the kills. She had a similar experience on October 8, 1944 when she launched torpedoes at a heavily escorted tanker north of Palawan Passage in the Philippine Islands. Again her crew heard two distinct explosions but were too busy dodging depth charges to observe the results of the attack. On October 9, 1944, however, she recorded her first verifiable success when she joined the submarine  in sinking the 1,943-gross register ton Japanese cargo ship Tokuwa Maru. Later in October 1944, she concluded her patrol, putting into Fremantle, Australia, for a refit.

Second war patrol
On November 16, 1944, Becuna stood out of Fremantle and embarked on her second war patrol. She cruised the waters of the South China Sea off the southern coast of Japanese-occupied French Indochina searching for Japanese fleet units. On December 23, 1944 she encountered the Japanese heavy cruiser  and light cruiser , which she mistakenly identified as a Yamato-class battleship and a "Nachi-class"(i.e., Myōkō-class) heavy cruiser, respectively. Lack of time prevented her from achieving a favorable setup before they entered Cam Ranh Bay on the coast of French Indochina. The remainder of Becuna′s patrol proved almost equally unsuccessful. She destroyed floating naval mines and, on her way back to Fremantle, sank two "sea trucks" — the American term for a type of small Japanese cargo ship — with her deck gun just north of Lombok Strait. During January 1945 she underwent a refit at Fremantle.

Third war patrol
Becuna embarked on her third war patrol in February 1945. She returned to the South China Sea off the coast of French Indochina, where she encountered a Japanese convoy off Cap Padaran on the morning of February 22, 1945. She fired a spread of torpedoes at the tanker Nichiryu Maru and sent her to the bottom. She endured a barrage of 70 depth charges from two escort vessels before escaping. She sighted no other Japanese shipping, and her patrol ended with her arrival at Subic Bay on Luzon in the Philippine Islands, where she underwent a refit.

Fourth war patrol
Becuna departed Subic Bay to begin her fourth war patrol in May 1945. She sighted no Japanese ships, and proceeded to Fremantle, where she arrived in early June 1945 and underwent a refit.

Fifth war patrol
On June 21, 1945, Becuna got underway from Fremantle for her fifth war patrol. On two occasions, Imperial Japanese Navy floatplanes on antisubmarine patrol subjected her to bombing attacks. Then, on the night of July 15, 1945, she made radar contact on a single fast-moving target in the Java Sea. After tracking it for several hours, she fired a spread of torpedoes in a night surface attack. They all missed, but the submarine  took up the chase and sank the vessel, the Ambon Island-bound Japanese torpedo boat . Becuna concluded her patrol at Subic Bay late in July 1945. While she was still undergoing a refit there, World War II ended on August 15, 1945 with the cessation of hostilities with Japan.

Post-World War II service
Becuna returned to the United States at San Diego, California, on September 22, 1945. She then served in the United States Pacific Fleet until 1949, conducting submarine crew training missions and participating in various multiship exercises. She visited Japan from November 15 to December 9, 1947 and from October 31 to November 6, 1948 and China from November 7 to 29, 1948.

In April 1949, Becuna was transferred to the United States Atlantic Fleet as a unit of Submarine Squadron 8. She operated from Groton, Connecticut, conducting refresher training exercises and frequently serving as a school ship for students at the Submarine School. That duty continued until November 1950, when she entered the shipyard of the Electric Boat Company at Groton for nine-month conversion under the Greater Underwater Propulsive Power (GUPPY) Program to a GUPPY IA submarine. She received additional batteries, a submarine snorkel, and a streamlined sail as well as a number of other modifications to various items of equipment.

Becuna completed the conversion in August 1951 and then conducted shakedown and refresher training in the West Indies. She returned to Naval Submarine Base New London Groton in September 1951. Over the ensuing 18 years, she operated from Groton, performing a variety of peacetime missions, most of them involving training. She served as a training ship for students at the Submarine School, and prospective submarine commanding officers made their familiarization cruises aboard her. She also provided test services to the Test and Evaluation Force and trained United States Naval Reserve personnel.

Becuna made two deployments to serve with the United States Sixth Fleet in the Mediterranean Sea, where she made numerous port visits. She also participated in many exercises with U.S. and foreign naval units. She made one cruise to Scotland, occasionally visited northern European ports, and was a frequent caller at ports in Canada, along the United States East Coast, and in the West Indies. In 1969, she was reclassified as an auxiliary submarine and given the hull classification symbol AGSS-319.

Decommissioning and disposal
Becuna was decommissioned on November 7, 1969 and laid up in the Atlantic Reserve Fleet at Philadelphia, Pennsylvania. Her hullclassification symbol reverted to SS-319 in 1971.

Becuna remained in reserve at Philadelphia until August 15, 1973, when her name was stricken from the Naval Vessel Register. In 1974, a prospective transfer of Becunato Venezuela fell through. On June 21, 1976, she was donated to the Cruiser Olympia Association for use as a memorial.

Honors and awards
 Asiatic-Pacific Campaign Medal with four battle stars for World War II service
 Navy Occupation Service Medal with "ASIA" clasp
 China Service Medal

Museum ship

Becuna was placed on permanent display adjacent to the cruiser  at Penn's Landing in Philadelphia, Pennsylvania, on June 21, 1976. Becuna was designated a National Historic Landmark in 1986. Since 1996, both vessels have been operated by the Independence Seaport Museum. Becuna received the Historical Welded Structure Award of the American Welding Society in 2001.

See also

List of National Historic Landmarks in Philadelphia
National Register of Historic Places listings in Center City, Philadelphia

References

External links
 
 

 Kill record: USS Becuna
 HUNTER KILLER ANTI-SUBMARINE WARFARE U.S. NAVY FILM 30102 on YouTube, 1954 film which includes footage of USS Becuna (SS-319) underway at sea
30102 HUNTER KILLER ANTI-SUBMARINE WARFARE U.S. NAVY FILM at Periscope Film, 1954 film which includes footage of USS Becuna (SS-319) underway at sea 

1944 ships
Balao-class submarines
Cold War submarines of the United States
Military and war museums in Pennsylvania
Museum ships in Pennsylvania
Museums in Philadelphia
National Historic Landmarks in Pennsylvania
Naval museums in the United States
Ships built in Groton, Connecticut
Ships on the National Register of Historic Places in Pennsylvania
World War II submarines of the United States
Penn's Landing
National Register of Historic Places in Philadelphia